Events from the year 1965 in Argentina.

Incumbents
 President: Arturo Umberto Illia
 Vice president: Carlos Humberto Perette

Governors
 Buenos Aires Province: Anselmo Marini 
 Cordoba: Justo Páez Molina
 Chubut Province: Roque González then Armando Knischnik then Manuel Pío Raso 
 Mendoza Province: Francisco Gabrielli
 Santa Fe Province: Aldo Tessio

Vice Governors
Buenos Aires Province: vacant

Events
14 March – In the legislative election, the Unión Popular captures 30.9% of the vote.
May – 1965 Argentina rugby union tour of Rhodesia and South Africa: The Argentine rugby union team embarks on its first tour outside South America.
26 October – Operación 90: Argentina launches its first ground expedition to the South Pole.

Births
27 January – Ignacio Noe, comic, children's book, and magazine artist
13 April – Patricio Pouchulu, architect
15 December – Luis Fabián Artime, footballer
29 December – Roberto Paul Pickett, Actor

See also
 1965 in Argentine football
 List of Argentine films of 1965

References

1965 in Argentina
1960s in Argentina
Years of the 20th century in Argentina
Argentina
Argentina